The 2021 Florida A&M Rattlers football team represented Florida A&M University in the 2021 NCAA Division I FCS football season. The Rattlers played their home games at Bragg Memorial Stadium in Tallahassee, Florida, and competed in the East Division of the Southwestern Athletic Conference (SWAC). They were led by third-year head coach Willie Simmons.

Schedule

Game summaries

vs. Jackson State

Fort Valley State

at South Florida

Alabama State

South Carolina State

at Alabama A&M

at Mississippi Valley State

Grambling State

at Southern

at Arkansas–Pine Bluff

vs. Bethune–Cookman

FCS Playoffs

vs. No. 18 Southeastern Louisiana – First Round

References

Florida AandM
Florida A&M Rattlers football seasons
Black college football national champions
2021 NCAA Division I FCS playoff participants
Florida AandM Rattlers football